The 2014 Tampines Rovers season saw the team compete in the 2014 S.League. They also competed in the 2014 AFC Cup after winning the 2014 S.League.

Squad

Sleague

Transfers

Transfers

In

Out

Competitions

S.League

League table

Matches

Singapore Cup

Tampines Rovers lost on penalty

Singapore League Cup

Group B

AFC Cup

Group H

References

Tampines Rovers
2014